Qareh Bolagh-e Olya (also Romanized as Qareh Bolāgh-e ‘Olyā) is a village in Keshavarz Rural District, Keshavarz District, Shahin Dezh County, West Azerbaijan Province, Iran. At the 2006 census, its population was 200, in 49 families.

References 

Populated places in Shahin Dezh County